Meritites II (Merytiotes, Meritetes) or Meritites A ("beloved of her father") was a 4th Dynasty princess of ancient Egypt, probably a daughter of King Khufu. She may have been a daughter of Meritites I based on the fact that this queen is mentioned in mastaba G 7650. She married the Director of the Palace, Akhethotep (a non-royal court official), and she had several children with her husband. Meritites and her husband shared a mastaba G 7650 in Giza.

Family and early life 
Meritites II was probably a daughter of Khufu, as she was said to be a King's daughter of his body and as the location of her tomb indicates a relation to Khufu. She was a Prophetess of Khufu, Hathor and Neith.

Meritites was married to Akhethotep, who was a director of the palace. Further titles of Akhethotep include Sole friend, Priest of the Bas of Nekhen, and Overseer of fishers/ fowlers. In the tomb several children are depicted. A block formerly in the McGregor collection, but now in Lisbon shows two daughters. One daughter is named Hetepheres and only a partial name has been preserved for the second girl: Khufu[...].

Burial 
Akhethotep and Meritites were buried at Giza in tomb G 7650. The mastaba is stone built and the interior offering room is decorated. Akhethotep is depicted with his wife Meritites and attendants in some of the scenes. In one scene Akhethotep is accompanied by two daughters. A red granite sarcophagus with a palace facade was discovered in shaft C. Meritites died during the reign of her brother Khafre.

Literature 

Princesses of the Fourth Dynasty of Egypt
26th-century BC women
3rd-millennium BC births
3rd-millennium BC deaths
Khufu